The Chicago Independent Radio Project (CHIRP) is a non-profit organization that operates a community radio station, CHIRP Radio. CHIRP is a non-profit 501(c)(3) organization funded primarily through individual giving, special event revenues, and grant support.

History
From 2007-2010, CHIRP partnered with organizations across the country to convince congress and the Federal Communications Commission to remove existing barriers to the granting of low power FM radio licenses in urban areas. In 2009, CHIRP's president and vice president, Shawn Campbell and Jenny Lizak, were invited to lead a White House meeting on the issue with President Obama's technology team. The bill CHIRP worked on to expand low-power FM was the Local Community Radio Act, which was signed into law in early 2011.

On January 17, 2010, CHIRP began as an online radio station. The first song played was "Thank You Friends" by the band Big Star.

In June 2011, CHIRP Radio was named "Best Overall Radio Station" by the Chicago Reader in its annual Best of Chicago issue.

In late 2014, CHIRP received a construction permit from the FCC to build a low-power FM broadcast outlet on Chicago's north side. In October 2017, the organization launched its broadcast at 107.1 MHz with the call letter "WCXP-LP".

Programming

CHIRP Factory Sessions 
The station began its CHIRP Factory Sessions series in January, 2015. These recordings consist of live sets recorded by local and touring bands in CHIRP's recording space, a former factory building. Once a Factory Session airs on CHIRP, full videos of the sessions are posted on the station's website.

Person of Interest 
Person of Interest is a first-person storytelling feature that airs monthly on CHIRP Radio. After airing on the station, they are hosted in the podcast section of the CHIRP website.

Events

Record Fairs 
CHIRP is well known for its two annual Record Fairs, a freestanding fair each April (known as The CHIRP Record Fair & Other Delights) and another fair as part of the Pitchfork Music Festival in July. The April fair draws many independent vinyl dealers from around the Midwest, while the Pitchfork fair features independent labels and distributors from around the country.

The First Time 
CHIRP produces and hosts The First Time, a quarterly live storytelling and music series. Following each reading, the house band, called "The First Time Three" (made up of members of Chicago power pop band Frisbie) plays a song that the reader has chosen that relates in some way to the piece. The series began in 2009 and takes place at Martyrs' on Chicago's north side.

CHIRP Night at The Whistler
CHIRP organizes a monthly concert series featuring local Chicago artists and bands at The Whistler, a Chicago bar. In 2015, this event was named Best Ongoing Local Music Showcase by NewCity.

References

External links
 CHIRP Radio official website

Internet radio stations in the United States
Radio stations in Chicago
Non-profit organizations based in Chicago